Why Not is the debut album by jazz pianist George Cables, released in 1975 on Why Not Records.

Track listing
All compositions by George Cables.

"Ebony Moonbeams" - 10:32
"Rita I and II" - 11:51
"Dark Side-Light Side" - 8:58
"Quiet Fire" - 9:47
"Why Not?" - 7:29
"Think on Me" - 9:20

Personnel
George Cables - piano
Tony Dumas - bass
Carl Burnett - drums

References

George Cables albums
1975 albums